Alena Kováčová (born 10 November 1978, in Poprad) is a Slovak former basketball player who competed in the 2000 Summer Olympics.

References

1978 births
Living people
Slovak women's basketball players
Olympic basketball players of Slovakia
Basketball players at the 2000 Summer Olympics
Sportspeople from Poprad